This is a list of notable Canadian exchange-traded funds, or ETFs. This is not an exhaustive list.

AGFiQ 
AGFiQ is a subsidiary of AGF Management Inc offering factor-based ETFs to manage volatility.
  – AGFiQ Enhanced Core Canadian Equity ETF
  – AGFiQ Enhanced Core US Equity ETF
  – AGFiQ Enhanced Core International Equity ETF
  – AGFiQ Enhanced Core Emerging Markets Equity ETF
  – AGFiQ Enhanced Global Infrastructure ETF
  – AGFiQ Enhanced Global ESG Factors ETF
  – AGFiQ Global Equity Rotation ETF
  – AGFiQ MultiAsset Allocation ETF
  – AGFiQ MultiAsset Income Allocation ETF

BlackRock Inc 
In Canada, BlackRock Inc. is the largest ETF provider, offering ETFs under the RBC iShares brand name
  – tracks the S&P/TSX 60 Total Return Index
  – tracks the S&P/TSX Capped Composite Index
  – tracks the S&P/TSX MidCap Index
  – tracks the S&P/TSX SmallCap Index
 –  tracks the Core MSCI EAFE IMI Index
  – tracks the S&P/TSX Capped Energy Index
  – tracks the S&P/TSX Capped Information Technology Index
  – tracks the S&P/TSX Capped Gold Index
  – tracks the S&P/TSX Capped Financials Index
  – tracks the S&P/TSX Capped Materials Index
  – tracks the S&P/TSX Capped Real Estate Investment Trust Index
  – tracks the S&P/TSX Income Trust Index
  – tracks the Dow Jones Canada Select Dividend Index
  – tracks the Dow Jones Canada Select Growth Index
  – tracks the Dow Jones Canada Select Value Index
  – tracks the Jantzi Social Index
  – tracks the Scotia Short-term bond Index
  – tracks the Scotia Capital Bond Index
  – tracks the Scotia Capital Real Return Bond Index
  – tracks the Scotia Capital All Corporate Bond Index
  – tracks the Scotia Capital All Government Bond Index
  – tracks the Scotia Capital Long Term Bond Index
  – tracks the S&P 500 Index (currency hedged)
  – tracks the Russell 2000 Index (currency hedged)
  – tracks the MSCI EAFE 100% Hedged to CAD Dollars Index (currency hedged)
  – tracks the MSCI Emerging Markets Index Fund Index
  – tracks the MSCI World Index Fund Index
  – tracks the Nasdaq 100 Index

BMO Asset Management 
BMO Asset Management offers the following ETFs available in Canada
  – BMO Dow Jones Canada Titans 60 Index ETF 
  – BMO Clean Energy Index ETF
  – BMO Dow Jones Industrial Average Hedged to CAD Index ETF 
  – BMO US Equity Hedged to CAD Index ETF 
  – BMO International Equity Hedged to CAD Index ETF 
  – BMO Emerging Markets Equity Index ETF 
  – BMO China Equity Hedged to CAD Index ETF 
  – BMO India Equity Hedged to CAD Index ETF 
  – BMO S&P/TSX Equal Weight Banks Index ETF 
  – BMO S&P/TSX Equal Weight Oil & Gas Index ETF 
  – BMO Equal Weight Utilities Index ETF 
  – BMO Equal Weight REITs Index ETF 
  – BMO NASDAQ 100 Equity Hedged to CAD Index ETF 
  – BMO Equal Weight U.S. Health Care Hedged to CAD Index ETF 
  – BMO Equal Weight U.S. Banks Hedged to CAD Index ETF 
  – BMO Global Infrastructure Index ETF 
  – BMO S&P/TSX Equal Weight Global Base Metals Hedged to CAD Index ETF 
  – BMO Junior Gold Index ETF 
  – BMO Junior Oil Index ETF 
  – BMO Junior Gas Index ETF 
  – BMO Aggregate Bond Index ETF 
  – BMO Short Federal Bond Index ETF 
  – BMO Mid Federal Bond Index ETF
  – BMO Long Federal Bond Index ETF 
  – BMO Real Return Bond Index ETF 
  – BMO Short Provincial Bond Index ETF 
  – BMO Short Corporate Bond Index ETF 
  – BMO Mid Corporate Bond Index ETF 
  – BMO Long Corporate Bond Index ETF 
  – BMO High Yield US Corporate Bond Hedged to CAD Index ETF 
  – BMO Emerging Markets Bond Hedged to CAD Index ETF 
  – BMO Canadian Dividend ETF
  – BMO S&P/TSX Laddered Preferred Share Index ETF
  – BMO Canada High Dividend Covered Call
  – BMO Europe High Dividend Covered Call Hedged to CAD ETF
  – BMO S&P/TSX Equal Weight Global Gold Index ETF
  – BMO S&P 500 Index ETF
  – BMO US Dividend ETF

Claymore Investments 
Claymore Investments also offers a series of ETFs available in Canada (Claymore has been acquired by BlackRock - iShares Canada so please refer to iShares Canada for any of these funds).
  – Claymore BRIC ETF tracks the BNY BRIC Select ADR Index (Brazil, Russia India and China)
  – Claymore CDN Dividend & Income Achievers ETF tracks Mergent's Canadian Dividend & Income Achievers Index.
  – Claymore Oil Sands Sector ETF tracks the Sustainable Oil Sands Sector Index
  – Claymore US Fundamental ETF (Canadian Dollar Hedged) tracks the FTSE RAFI US 1000 Canadian Dollar Hedged Index
  – Claymore Canadian Fundamental Index ETF tracks the FTSE RAFI Canada Index
  – Claymore S&P Global Water ETF tracks the S&P Global Water Index 
  – Claymore International Fundamental Index ETF tracks the FTSE RAFI Developed ex US 1000 Index
  – Claymore Japan Fundamental Index ETF tracks the FTSE RAFI Japan Canadian Dollar Hedged Index
  – Claymore S&P/TSX Preferred Share ETF tracks the S&P/TSX Preferred Share Index

Evolve ETFs 
Evolve specializes in thematic, innovation-oriented ETFs.

  – Evolve Cyber Security Index Fund
 – Evolve Innovation Index Fund
 – Evolve Automobile Innovation Index Fund
 – Evolve E-Gaming Index ETF
 – Evolve Global Materials & Mining Enhanced Yield Index ETF
  – Evolve US Banks Enhanced Yield Fund
 – Evolve Global Healthcare Enhanced Yield Fund
 – Evolve Active Global Fixed Income Fund
 – Evolve Active Canadian Preferred Share Fund
 – Evolve Dividend Stability Preferred Share Index ETF
 NEO: FIXD - Evolve Active Core Fixed Income Fund
 NEO: HISA - High Interest Savings Account Fund

Hamilton ETFs (Hamilton Capital Partners Inc.) 
Hamilton ETFs is an ETF manager headquartered in Toronto, Ontario offering actively managed, financial services-oriented ETFs.
  – Hamilton Financials Innovation ETF ETF
  – Hamilton Global Financial ETF
  – Hamilton U.S. Mid/Small-Cap Financials ETF
  – Hamilton U.S. Mid/Small-Cap Financials ETF (U.S. dollar version)
  – Hamilton Canadian Bank Mean Reversion Index ETF
  – Hamilton Australian Bank Equal-Weight Index ETF
  – Hamilton Enhanced Canadian Bank ETF
  – Hamilton Enhanced Multi-Sector Covered Call ETF

Harvest ETFs 
Harvest ETFs is an independent ETF manager based in Oakville, Ontario. 

 TSX: HHL - Harvest Healthcare Leaders Income ETF
 TSX: HTA - Harvest Tech Achievers Growth & Income ETF
 TSX: HBF - Harvest Brand Leaders Plus Income ETF
 TSX: HUTL - Harvest Equal Weight Global Utilities Income ETF
 TSX: HLIF - Harvest Canadian Equity Income Leaders ETF
 TSX: HUBL - Harvest US Bank Leaders Income ETF
 TSX: HGR - Harvest Global REIT Leaders Income ETF
 TSX: HPF - Harvest Energy Leaders Plus Income ETF
 TSX: HESG - Harvest ESG Equity Income Index ETF
 TSX: HDIF - Harvest Diversified Monthly Income ETF
 TSX: HHLE - Harvest Healthcare Leaders Enhanced Income ETF 
 TSX: HTAE - Harvest Tech Achievers Enhanced Income ETF
 TSX: HUTE - Harvest Equal Weight Global Utilities Enhanced Income ETF
 TSX: HBFE - Harvest Brand Leaders Enhanced Income ETF
 TSX: HLFE - Harvest Canadian Equity Enhanced Income Leaders ETF 
 TSX: HGGG - Harvest Global Gold Giants Index ETF
 TSX: TRVL - Harvest Travel & Leisure Index ETF
 TSX: HBLK - Blockchain Technologies ETF
 TSX: HCLN - Harvest Clean Energy ETF

Horizons ETFs Management 
Horizons Betapro also offers a series of ETFs available in Canada:
  – the Horizons U.S. Dollar Currency ETF
  – the Horizons U.S. Dollar Currency ETF listed in USD
  – the "HBP 60 Bull + ETF" tracks two times (200%) the daily performance of the S&P/TSX 60 Total Return Index
  – the "HBP 60 Bear + ETF" tracks two times (200%) the inverse (opposite) of the daily performance of the S&P/TSX 60 Total Return Index
  – the Horizons BetaPro S&P/TSX Capped Energy Bull Plus ETF tracks two times (200%) the daily performance of the S&P/TSX Capped Energy Index.
  – the Horizons BetaPro S&P/TSX Capped Energy Bear Plus ETF tracks two times (200%) inverse the daily performance of the S&P/TSX Capped Energy Index
  – the Horizons BetaPro S&P/TSX Capped Financial Bull Plus ETF tracks two times (200%) the daily performance of the S&P/TSX Capped Financials Index.
  – the Horizons BetaPro S&P/TSX Capped Financials Bear Plus ETF tracks two times (200%) inverse the daily performance of the S&P/TSX Capped Financials Index.
  – the Horizons BetaPro S&P/TSX Global Mining Bull Plus ETF tracks two times (200%)  the daily performance of the S&P/TSX Global Mining Index.
  – the Horizons BetaPro S&P/TSX Global Mining Bear Plus ETF tracks two times (200%) inverse the daily performance of the S&P/TSX Global Mining Index.
  – the Horizons BetaPro NYMEX Crude Oil Bull Plus ETF tracks two times (200%) the daily performance of NYMEX Crude Oil.
  – the Horizons BetaPro NYMEX Crude Oil Bear Plus ETF tracks two times (200%) inverse the daily performance of NYMEX Crude Oil.
  – the Horizons BetaPro NYMEX Natural Gas Bull Plus ETF tracks two times (200%) the daily performance of NYMEX Natural Gas.
  – the Horizons BetaPro NYMEX Natural Gas Bear Plus ETF tracks two times (200%) inverse the daily performance of NYMEX Natural Gas.
  – the Horizons BetaPro COMEX Gold Bull Plus ETF tracks two times (200%) the daily performance of COMEX Gold.
  – the Horizons BetaPro COMEX Gold Bear Plus ETF tracks two times (200%) inverse the daily performance of COMEX Gold.
  – the Horizons BetaPro DJ-AIG Agricultural Grains Bull Plus ETF tracks two times (200%) the daily performance of the DJ-AIG Grains Sub-Index.
  – the Horizons BetaPro DG-AIG Agricultural Grains Bear Plus ETF tracks two times (200%) inverse the daily performance of the DJ-AIG Grains Sub-Index.
  – the Horizons CDN Select Universe Bond ETF seeks to replicate the performance of the Solactive Canadian Select Universe Bond Index (Total Return).

First Asset 
  – First Asset European Bank ETF 	
  – First Asset MSCI Canada Low Risk Weighted ETF 	
  – First Asset MSCI Europe Low Risk Weighted ETF (CAD Hedged) 	
  – First Asset MSCI Europe Low Risk Weighted ETF (Unhedged) 	
  – First Asset MSCI USA Low Risk Weighted ETF (CAD Hedged) 	
  – First Asset MSCI USA Low Risk Weighted ETF (Unhedged) 	
  – First Asset MSCI World Low Risk Weighted ETF (CAD Hedged) 	
  – First Asset MSCI World Low Risk Weighted ETF (Unhedged) 	
  – First Asset Morningstar Canada Dividend Target 30 Index ETF 	
  – First Asset Morningstar Canada Momentum Index ETF 	
  – First Asset Morningstar Canada Value Index ETF 	
  – First Asset Morningstar National Bank Québec Index ETF 	
  – First Asset Morningstar US Dividend Target 50 Index ETF (CAD Hedged) 	
  – First Asset Morningstar US Dividend Target 50 Index ETF (Unhedged) 	
  – First Asset Morningstar US Momentum Index ETF (CAD Hedged) 	
  – First Asset Morningstar US Momentum Index ETF (Unhedged) 	
  – First Asset Morningstar US Value Index ETF (CAD Hedged) 	
  – First Asset Morningstar US Value Index ETF (Unhedged) 	
  – First Asset Tech Giants Covered Call ETF (CAD Hedged) 	
  – First Asset DEX 1-5 Year Laddered Government Strip Bond Index ETF 	
  – First Asset DEX All Canada Bond Barbell Index ETF 	
  – First Asset DEX Corporate Bond Barbell Index ETF 	
  – First Asset DEX Government Bond Barbell Index ETF 	
  – First Asset DEX Provincial Bond Index ETF 	
  – First Asset Morningstar Emerging Markets Composite Bond Index ETF

Purpose Investments Inc. 
Purpose Investments Inc. is a division of Purpose Financial, a technology-driven financial services company. Purpose Investments offers the following 51 ETFs listed on the TSX and NEO exchanges:

  - Purpose High Interest Savings ETF
 NEO: MJJ - Purpose Marijuana Opportunities Fund
  - Purpose US Cash ETF
  - Purpose Global Bond Fund
  - Purpose Floating Rate Income Fund— FX Hedged
  - Purpose Floating Rate Income Fund— Non-FX Hedged
  - Purpose Floating Rate Income Fund— USD
  - Purpose Managed Duration Investment Grade Bond Fund
  - Purpose Total Return Bond Fund
 NEO: PCF - Purpose Energy Credit Fund— FX Hedged
 NEO: PCF.U - Purpose Energy Credit Fund — USD
 NEO: RPS - Purpose Canadian Preferred Share Fund
 NEO: RPU - Purpose US Preferred Share Fund— FX Hedged
 NEO: RPU.B - Purpose US Preferred Share Fund— Non-FX Hedged
 NEO: RPU.U - Purpose US Preferred Share Fund— USD
  - Purpose Short Duration Tactical Bond Fund
  - Purpose Strategic Yield Fund— FX Hedged
  - Purpose Canadian Financial Income Fund
  - Purpose Core Dividend Fund
  - Purpose Enhanced Dividend Fund
  - Purpose Global Financials Income Fund
  - Purpose International Dividend Fund
  - Purpose US Dividend Fund — FX Hedged
  - Purpose US Dividend Fund— Non-FX Hedged
 NEO: RDE - Purpose Core Equity Income Fund
 NEO: REM - Purpose Emerging Markets Dividend Fund
  - Purpose Monthly Income Fund
  - Purpose Multi-Asset Income Fund
  - Purpose Conservative Income Fund
 NEO: RTA - Purpose Tactical Asset Allocation Fund
 NEO: BHAV - Purpose Behavioural Opportunities Fund
  - Purpose Best Ideas Fund — FX Hedged
  - Purpose Best Ideas Fund— Non-FX Hedged
  - Purpose Global Innovators Fund
  - Purpose Gold Bullion Fund — FX Hedged
  - Purpose Gold Bullion Fund— Non-FX Hedged
  - Purpose Gold Bullion Fund — USD
  - Purpose Enhanced US Equity Fund— FX Hedged
  - Purpose Enhanced US Equity Fund— Non-FX Hedged
  - Purpose Tactical Hedged Equity Fund— FX Hedged
  - Purpose Tactical Hedged Equity Fund— Non-FX Hedged
  - Purpose Duration Hedged Real Estate Fund
  - Purpose International Tactical Hedged Equity Fund
  - Purpose Multi-Strategy Market Neutral Fund
  - Purpose Diversified Real Asset Fund
  - Purpose Premium Yield Fund— FX Hedged
  - Purpose Premium Yield Fund— Non-FX Hedged
  - Purpose Premium Yield Fund — USD
  - Purpose Silver Bullion Fund— FX Hedged
  - Purpose Silver Bullion Fund— Non-FX Hedged
  - Purpose Silver Bullion Fund — USD
  - Purpose Bitcoin ETF — FX Hedged
  - Purpose Bitcoin ETF — Non-FX Hedged
  - Purpose Bitcoin ETF — USD

Vanguard Investments Canada Inc. 
Vanguard Investments Canada Inc. offers the following 21 ETFs listed on the TSX:
  – Vanguard FTSE Canada Index ETF
  – Vanguard FTSE Canada All Cap Index ETF
  – Vanguard FTSE Canadian High Dividend Yield Index ETF
  – Vanguard FTSE Canadian Capped REIT Index ETF
  – Vanguard U.S. Total Market Index ETF
  – Vanguard U.S. Total Market Index ETF (CAD-hedged)
  – Vanguard S&P 500 Index
  – Vanguard S&P 500 Index (CAD-hedged)
  – Vanguard U.S. Dividend Appreciation Index ETF
  – Vanguard U.S. Dividend Appreciation Index ETF (CAD-hedged)
  – Vanguard FTSE All-World ex Canada Index ETF
  – Vanguard FTSE Developed ex North America Index ETF
  – Vanguard FTSE Developed ex North America Index ETF (CAD-hedged)
  – Vanguard FTSE Developed Europe Index ETF
  – Vanguard FTSE Asia Pacific Index ETF
  – Vanguard FTSE Emerging Markets Index ETF
  – Vanguard Canadian Aggregate Bond Index ETF 
  – Vanguard Canadian Short-Term Bond Index ETF
  – Vanguard Canadian Short-Term Corporate Bond Index ETF
  – Vanguard U.S. Aggregate Bond Index ETF (CAD-hedged)
  – Vanguard Global ex-U.S. Aggregate Bond Index ETF (CAD-hedged)
  – Vanguard Global Momentum Factor ETF (VMO)
  – Vanguard Global Value Factor ETF (VVL)
  – Vanguard Balanced ETF Portfolio (VBAL)
  – Vanguard Conservative ETF Portfolio (VCNS)
  – Vanguard Growth ETF Portfolio (VGRO)
  – Vanguard All Equity ETF (VEQT)

WisdomTree Canada 
  – WisdomTree Yield Enhanced Canada Short-Term Aggregate Bond Index ETF.
  – WisdomTree Europe Hedged Equity Index ETF.
  – WisdomTree Yield Enhanced Canada Aggregate Bond Index ETF.
  – ONE Global Equity ETF.
  – WisdomTree U.S. Quality Dividend Growth Index ETF.
  – WisdomTree Europe Hedged Equity Index ETF.
  – WisdomTree U.S. Quality Dividend Growth Index ETF.
  – WisdomTree U.S. MidCap Dividend Index ETF.
  – WisdomTree U.S. Quality Dividend Growth Variably Hedged Index ETF™.
  – WisdomTree International Quality Dividend Growth Index ETF.
  – WisdomTree International Quality Dividend Growth Index ETF.
  – WisdomTree International Quality Dividend Growth Variably Hedged Index ETF™.
  – WisdomTree U.S. High Dividend Index ETF.
  – WisdomTree U.S. High Dividend Index ETF.
  – WisdomTree Canada Quality Dividend Growth Index ETF.
  – WisdomTree Emerging Markets Dividend Index ETF.
  – WisdomTreee U.S. MidCap Dividend Index ETF.

Invesco 
  - PowerShares Low Volatility Portfolio ETF - CAD, May 6, 2015
  - PowerShares Tactical Bond ETF, Aug 24 2012
  - PowerShares 1-3 Year Laddered Floating Rate Note Index ETF, Jul 21 2014
  - PowerShares 1-5 Year Laddered Investment Grade Corporate Bond Index ETF, Jun 15 2011
  - PowerShares LadderRite U.S. 0-5 Year Corporate Bond Index ETF - CAD, Jul 21 2014
  - PowerShares LadderRite U.S. 0-5 Year Corporate Bond Index ETF - USD, Jul 21 2014
  - PowerShares Ultra Liquid Long Term Government Bond Index ETF, Jun 15 2011
  - PowerShares Senior Loan (CAD Hedged) Index ETF, Apr 16 2012
  - PowerShares Fundamental High Yield Corporate Bond (CAD Hedged) Index ETF, Jun 21 2011
  - PowerShares Canadian Preferred Share Index ETF, Jun 16 2011
  - PowerShares Canadian Dividend Index ETF, Jun 16 2011
  - PowerShares Global Shareholder Yield ETF - CAD, May 6, 2015
  - PowerShares Global Shareholder Yield ETF - USD, May 6, 2015
  - PowerShares S&P/TSX Composite Low Volatility Index ETF, Apr 24 2012
  - PowerShares S&P 500 Low Volatility (CAD Hedged) Index ETF, Jan 24 2012
  - PowerShares S&P International Developed Low Volatility Index ETF, Sep 08 2014
  - PowerShares S&P Emerging Markets Low Volatility Index ETF, Sep 08 2014
  - PowerShares FTSE RAFI Canadian Fundamental Index ETF, Jan 26 2012
  - PowerShares FTSE RAFI Canadian Small-Mid Fundamental Index ETF, Apr 14 2015
  - PowerShares FTSE RAFI U.S. Fundamental Index ETF - CAD, Apr 14 2015
  - PowerShares FTSE RAFI U.S. Fundamental Index ETF - USD, Apr 14 2015
  - PowerShares FTSE RAFI US Fundamental (CAD Hedged) Index ETF, Jan 26 2012
  - PowerShares FTSE RAFI Global+ Fundamental Index ETF - CAD, Apr 14 2015
  - PowerShares FTSE RAFI Global+ Fundamental Index ETF - USD, Apr 14 2015
  - PowerShares FTSE RAFI Global Small-Mid Fundamental ETF - CAD, May 6, 2015
  - PowerShares FTSE RAFI Global Small-Mid Fundamental ETF - USD, May 6, 2015
  - PowerShares QQQ (CAD Hedged) Index ETF, Jun 16 2011

First Trust 
  - First Trust Canadian Capital Strength ETF
  - First Trust Canadian Capital Strength ETF
  - First Trust AlphaDEX™ Emerging Market Dividend ETF (CAD-Hedged)
  - First Trust AlphaDEX™ Emerging Market Dividend ETF (CAD-Hedged)
  - First Trust AlphaDEX™ European Dividend Index ETF (CAD-Hedged)
  - First Trust AlphaDEX™ European Dividend Index ETF (CAD-Hedged)
  - First Trust AlphaDEX™ U.S. Dividend ETF (CAD-Hedged)
  - First Trust AlphaDEX™ U.S. Dividend ETF (CAD-Hedged)
  - First Trust AlphaDEX™ U.S. Consumer Discretionary Sector Index ETF
  - First Trust AlphaDEX™ U.S. Consumer Staples Sector Index ETF
  - First Trust AlphaDEX™ U.S. Energy Sector Index ETF
  - First Trust AlphaDEX™ U.S. Financial Sector Index ETF
  - First Trust AlphaDEX™ U.S. Health Care Sector Index ETF
  - First Trust AlphaDEX™ U.S. Industrials Sector Index ETF
  - First Trust AlphaDEX™ U.S. Materials Sector Index ETF
  - First Trust AlphaDEX™ U.S. Technology Sector Index ETF
  - First Trust AlphaDEX™ U.S. Utilities Sector Index ETF
  - First Trust Senior Loan ETF (CAD-Hedged)
  - First Trust Senior Loan ETF (CAD-Hedged)
  - First Trust Short Duration High Yield Bond ETF (CAD-Hedged)
  - First Trust Short Duration High Yield Bond ETF (CAD-Hedged)
  - First Trust Global Risk Managed Income Index ETF
  - First Trust Global Risk Managed Income Index ETF
  - First Trust Tactical Bond Index ETF
  - First Trust Dorsey Wright U.S. Sector Rotation Index ETF (CAD-Hedged)

ETF Table

See also
List of exchange-traded funds
List of American exchange-traded funds

References

Canadian